John Simeon Block is an American documentary filmmaker.

Career
John Block, a native of Chicago, is a 1972 graduate from Northwestern University. In 1977 he obtained a Master of Fine Arts in filmmaking from the New York University. From 1980 until 1983 he worked for WCBS and then came to NBC in 1983. Initially he was a "Special Segment" producer for the NBC Nightly News with Tom Brokaw. In 1990 he became a producer/writer for Real Life with Jane Pauley and in 1991 a producer/writer for the Brokaw Reports. From 1992 until 2009 Block was a producer/writer for Dateline NBC.

Since 2010, Block has been an independent producer and filmmaker.

Block's subjects cover a wide spectrum of social issues and problems including poverty, homelessness, medical issues, broken families, drugs, crime, and education. He has also made videos for educational and medical support programs.

Personal life
Block resides in Montclair, New Jersey with his wife Maria. They have three children.

Awards
 1981 Guggenheim Fellowship
 10 nominations and 3 Emmy Awards

Selected filmography
 The Sixth Week (1978), "Best Documentary", Student Academy Awards of the Academy of Motion Pictures
 1981-82 Daytime National Emmy for work on children series
 Class Photo (1995), Dateline NBC, a documentary about the fate of 21 of 25 Afro-American youths from Bedford-Stuyvesant twelve years after their fourth-grade class picture, duPont-Columbia Award
 Miracle on the Hudson (2007), at Dateline NBC documentary, Emmy Award
 New Orleans Rising (2010), a CNN documentary
 Different is the New Normal (2011), about a young man with Tourette syndrome, Emmy nomination
 The Stand-In (2011), a personal documentary about elder care and the undocumented with a premiere on PBS.
 Sounding the Alarm: Battling the Autism Epidemic (2014), a documentary about raising a child with autism, presented at the Nantucket Film Festival and the Tribeca Film Festival
 The One That Got Away (2016), a documentary about a promising at-risk youth who went to jail. Preview at the 2015 Montclair Film Festival and premiere at PBS.
 Breslin and Hamill: Deadline Artists (2019), an HBO documentary about two journalists from New York City, Jimmy Breslin and Pete Hamill, 2020 Emmy Award for Outstanding Historical Documentary.

References

External links

Living people
1951 births
American documentary filmmakers
Film producers from Illinois
People from Montclair, New Jersey
People from Chicago
Emmy Award winners
NBC News people
Film producers from New Jersey